Un Día Nuevo is the sixth studio album by Peruvian rock group Libido. The initial works for the album started in 2008 with the collaboration of sound engineer Rafael De La Lama, Tweety Gonzáles in pre-production and Duane Baron in the production and later on, recording in Los Angeles. The album started to be mixed in London at the Sarm Studios, the process continued in Lima and was finished by Andrew Scheps in Los Angeles.

Release and promotion
Months before the release of Un Día Nuevo, Libido had begun a publicity strategy to the mobile phone network Claro. The day of release Libido make a feast celebrating the fifth studio album released.

Track listing

Release history

References

Líbido (band) albums
2009 albums